Hamid Samandarian ; May 6, 1931 – July 12, 2012) was an Iranian film and theater director and translator. He staged numerous dramas including No Exit by Jean-Paul Sartre, Ghosts by Henrik Ibsen, The Glass Menagerie by Tennessee Williams and Marriage of Mr. Mississippi by Friedrich Durrenmatt.

Having established many acting and directing classes and workshops, Samandarian trained many Iranian actors and directors including; Ezzatolah Entezami, Reza Kianian, Golab Adineh, Mehdi Hashemi, Shahab Hosseini, Hojjat Baqaee٫ Parviz Poorhosseini, Ahmad Aghalou, etc. He married Homa Rousta, an Iranian film and theater actress.

Teaching 

Danial Hakimi was one of his students.

Theater 

He translated and then staged many famous plays written by famous playwrights during his lifetime such as Friedrich Durrenmatt, Bertolt Brecht, Anton Chekhov, Eugène Ionesco, Arthur Miller, Max Frisch, Tennessee Williams, Jean-Paul Sartre, and Henrik Ibsen.

 The Visit of the Lady, Friedrich Dürrenmatt – 2008
 The Caucasian Chalk Circle, Bertolt Brecht – 1999
 The Marriage of Mr. Mississippi, Friedrich Dürrenmatt – 1990
 The Seagull, Anton Chekhov – 1978
 Play Strindberg, Friedrich Dürrenmatt – 1973 and 2000
 Rhinoceros, Eugène Ionesco – 1973
 A View from the Bridge, Arthur Miller – 1970
 Andorra, Max Frisch – 1968
 The Forced Marriage, Molière – 1965
 The Glass Menagerie, Tennessee Williams – 1964
 Morts sans sépulture, Jean-Paul Sartre – 1964 and 1979
 Ghosts, Henrik Ibsen – 1964

His translation of Bertolt Brecht's play Life of Galileo was published in 2014.

Cinema 

He directed one film, All the Temptations of the Earth,  in 1989.

Written works 

Many of his translations are published to Persian readership. Other than translations, some interviews with Samandarian are published. One book-length instance is in sahne khaneye man ast ("This Stage is my House"). He is also one of the directors whose talks are included in Ahmad Kamyabi Mask's important Qu'a-t-on fait de Rhinocéros d'Eugène Ionesco à travers le monde?: Allemagne, France, Roumanie, Iran, Japon, U.S.A..

References

External links 
 

1931 births
2012 deaths
Iranian film directors
Iranian theatre directors
Burials at artist's block of Behesht-e Zahra